
Franz Gall (2 September 1884 – 27 December 1944) was a German general during World War II, best known as defender of the island fortress Elba.  

He was a recipient of the Knight's Cross of the Iron Cross of Nazi Germany. Gall was killed on 27 December 1944 near Mestre, Italy, where he was Commander of the Venice Defense Sector.
Franz Gall was promoted to lieutenant general in the Wehrmacht during World War II. He took part in Operation Barbarossa, the Siege of Leningrad, and the campaign in Italy.

His son is Lothar Gall, a historian.

Awards and decorations 

 Knight's Cross of the Iron Cross on 19 June 1944 as Generalleutnant and defender of the island fortress Elba

References

Citations

Bibliography
 

1884 births
1944 deaths
Military personnel from Trier
Lieutenant generals of the German Army (Wehrmacht)
German Army personnel of World War I
Recipients of the clasp to the Iron Cross, 1st class
Recipients of the Knight's Cross of the Iron Cross
German Army personnel killed in World War II
People from the Rhine Province
German Army generals of World War II